The Division of Wannon is an Australian Electoral Division in the state of Victoria.

History

The division was proclaimed in 1900, and was one of the original 65 divisions to be contested at the first Federal election. The division was named after the Wannon River. For the first half-century after Federation, it regularly traded hands between the Australian Labor Party and the conservative parties. However, a 1955 redistribution removed most of the seat's Labor-friendly territory, and it has been a safe Liberal seat for most of its history since then.

The seat's most notable member was Prime Minister Malcolm Fraser, to date the last prime minister from a country seat.  His successor, David Hawker, was Speaker of the Australian House of Representatives during the last term of the Howard Government.  Hawker retired in 2010 and was succeeded by Dan Tehan.

Boundaries
Since 1984, federal electoral division boundaries in Australia have been determined at redistributions by a redistribution committee appointed by the Australian Electoral Commission. Redistributions occur for the boundaries of divisions in a particular state, and they occur every seven years, or sooner if a state's representation entitlement changes or when divisions of a state are malapportioned.

The division is located in the south-west of the state, and encompasses most of the Western District of the state. It adjoins the South Australian border in the west, the Bass Strait coast in the south to Anglesea in the east, and extends north to the Grampians.  Following the redistribution on 26 July 2021 the division encompasses the towns of Warrnambool, Colac, Portland, Hamilton, and Ararat. The Budj Bim, Great Otway, Lower Glenelg, and Port Campbell National Parks are in the division, as is southern portion of the Grampians National Park.

Members

Election results

References

External links
 Division of Wannon - Australian Electoral Commission

Electoral divisions of Australia
Constituencies established in 1901
1901 establishments in Australia
Warrnambool
Ararat, Victoria
Shire of Colac Otway
Shire of Corangamite
Shire of Glenelg
Shire of Southern Grampians
Shire of Moyne
Barwon South West (region)